Raul Giovanni "Gio" Miglietti (born September 5, 1999) is an American soccer player.

Career 
Miglietti attended El Segundo High School in El Segundo, California. Miglietti has played within the academies of Seattle Sounders FC and Pateadores SC. In 2018, he played for the USL Championship team Seattle Sounders FC 2, starting in 4 of the 7 matches he appeared in that season. Following the end of the 2018 USLC season, he joined the Huskies men's soccer team at the University of Washington.

After finishing his college career in 2022, Miglietti signed with Tacoma Defiance (the rebranded Sounders FC 2) on January 26, 2023.

References

External links 
 
 Gio Miglietti at Washington Huskies
 Raul Miglietti at U.S. Soccer Development Academy

Living people
1999 births
American soccer players
Tacoma Defiance players
Washington Huskies men's soccer players
People from Hawthorne, California
Association football midfielders
El Segundo High School alumni
Soccer players from California
Sportspeople from Los Angeles County, California
USL Championship players